Marina de Cudeyo is a municipality located in the autonomous community of Cantabria, Spain. According to the 2007 census, the city has a population of 5,000 inhabitants. Its capital is Rubayo.

Towns
Rubayo (capital)
Pedreña
Pontejos
Gajano
Orejo
Elechas
Setién
Agüero

References

External links
Marina de Cudeyo - Cantabria 102 Municipios

Municipalities in Cantabria